Fort Laramie may refer to:

Fort Laramie National Historic Site, a famous 19th-century trading post and U.S. Army fort in eastern Wyoming
Fort Laramie, Wyoming, the modern town located near the fort site
Fort Laramie (radio), a 1956 Western show
Treaty of Fort Laramie (disambiguation), US treaties with Native Americans
Treaty of Fort Laramie (1851)
Treaty of Fort Laramie (1868)
Revolt at Fort Laramie, a 1957 movie

See also
Fort Loramie, Ohio, a village in western Ohio, initially a frontier fort built by General Anthony Wayne in 1795
Laramie (disambiguation), for persons and other uses